Phyllis A. Katz (born April 9, 1938) is a clinical and developmental psychologist who has spent most of her career researching how children acquire attitudes towards race and gender. In 2002, she received the American Psychological Association's Award for Distinguished Senior Career Contributions to the Public Interest.

Early life and education
On April 9, 1938, Phyllis A. Katz was born to Alice Weiner and Martin Alberts in Brooklyn, New York. She grew up in Brooklyn as an only child, and attended Lincoln High School.

Katz began attending Syracuse University in 1954 and graduated with a Bachelor of Arts in 1957. From Syracuse she moved to Yale University to conduct her graduate studies in psychology, where she received a Doctor of Philosophy in 1961.

Awards
Katz received the Committee on Women in Psychology's Senior Leadership Award in 1989.

References

Yale University alumni
American women psychologists
21st-century American psychologists
20th-century American women scientists
1938 births
Living people
21st-century American women
20th-century American psychologists